Elderspeak is a specialized speech style used by younger adults with older adults, characterized by simpler vocabulary and sentence structure, filler words, content words, overly-endearing terms, closed-ended questions, using the collective "we", repetition, and speaking more slowly. Elderspeak stems from the stereotype that older people have reduced cognitive abilities, such as in language processing and production, and its use may be a result of or contribute to ageism. Although some aspects of elderspeak may be beneficial for some recipients, it is generally seen as inappropriate and a hindrance to intergenerational communication.

Elderspeak and communication accommodation
Communication accommodation theory and code-switching look at how we modify our speech for our conversation partners. People can change their speech to be more similar to their conversation partners’ speech, which is known as convergence. In other circumstances, people may change their speech to be more distinct, a process known as divergence. Furthermore, these modifications can promote fluidity of conversation and ease understanding. People tend to draw on stereotypes to infer what types of accommodations need to be made. In terms of intergenerational communication, young people tend to over-accommodate when conversing with older persons. That is, they make more adjustments than necessary. Young people tend to infer that older adults are slower at processing information and more cognitively inflexible. They make these inferences based on the perception of their conversation partner as old, rather than based on information about their conversational ability. This belief leads to more accommodations than necessary. 
Ryan and colleagues (1986) assessed several strategies used by younger individuals when accommodating to older adults which include:
 Overaccommodation due to physical or sensory disabilities: speakers perceive interlocutors to have a disability affecting conversation ability, but the speaker accommodates more than necessary
 Dependency-related overaccommodation: this occurs in situations where the older person is dependent on the younger person. The younger person's speech is dominating and controlling. This pattern can be seen in interactions between an older person and their caregiver.
 Age-related divergence: the young person attempts to emphasize distinctiveness of their ingroup (young) from the outgroup (old). The young person does this by speaking very quickly and using more modern colloquialisms, alienating or accentuating the differences of the older person.  
 Intergroup accommodation: Speaker perceives interlocutors as older, which triggers negative stereotypes about their ability. The speaker makes accommodations based on perceptions about the interlocutor's ingroup, rather than the person themselves.

Use of elderspeak
Elderspeak is used in many different contexts by young people when talking to elder adults. Research by Susan Kemper  demonstrated that both volunteers and professional caregivers engaged in elderspeak when interacting with the elderly. Furthermore, elderspeak is used regardless of the communicative ability of the older person. It was used when interacting with older adults who were healthy and active community members, as well as those in institutional settings. Surprisingly, caregivers used patronizing speech both when addressing adults with dementia (and reduced communication abilities), as well as those without dementia  which demonstrates that age cues are more salient to speakers than mental or physical health cues, and cues about communicative ability.  
Unfortunately, Elderspeak is based on stereotypes and not actual behaviour of elders because it is used in situations where older adults are clearly functioning well. Elderspeak is actually offensive but nursing home residents are no longer offended by these speech patterns because they have claimed it as a normal habit. The use of elderspeak in more  “warmth”  and lower in a “superiority” dimension when the speaker was a family member and/or friend compared to an unfamiliar. Generally, young adults use an overstated version of elderspeak when addressing impaired older persons. When older adults converse with older people with cognitive impairments, they make speech accommodations to a lesser extent than young people. They speak more slowly and incorporate more pauses, however they do not use more repetition as young people do. It is possible that older speakers may not accommodate their speech as much in order to avoid seeming patronizing. Research shows that approximately 80% of communication is non verbal. Elderspeak involves communicating to the older adult in a coddling way, which includes non verbal cues and gestures. An example would be looming over a wheelchair or bed in dominancy, or a pat on the buttocks resembling parent-child touching.

Alzheimer's

Alzheimer's disease (AD) is a progressive neurodegenerative condition that gradually destroys the abilities to remember, reason, and engage in meaningful social interaction. AD Caregivers report that most of their stress comes from unsuccessful attempts to communicate with their patients. In an effort to improve the communicative interaction between caregiver and patient, many clinicians advise caregivers to modify their speech when talking to the patient. “The main task for a person with Alzheimer’s is to maintain a sense of self or personhood,” Dr. Williams said. “If you know you’re losing your cognitive abilities and trying to maintain your personhood, and someone talks to you like a baby, it’s upsetting to you.” (Leland, 2008) 
Caretakers of adults with Alzheimer's are often told to speak to their patients more slowly, although slow speech has not been proven to improve comprehension in patients with Alzheimer's.

Non-medical
Elderspeak is also commonly used in the general community, not only in the context of health care. In the workplace elderspeak is quite prevalent. Elderly persons usually receive mistreatment from those that they trust or depend on, or who depend on them. In the workplace these people could be managerial, supervisory, and peer staff. Severe forms of elderspeak contribute to discrimination in the workplace, potentially infringing on the basic human right of that individual to a safe work environment. Elderspeak is affected by context, such as community or institute, meaning that people use elderspeak towards elderly people in the community, such as in the grocery store or the coffee shop, or in an institute such as a nursing home. An element of context is the relationship between the speaker and the elderly person.  People in closer relationships will be more likely to know the cognitive function of the individual; acquaintances or strangers would be less likely to make accurate judgements of this.

Consequences of elderspeak
Popular theories about elderspeak posit that it originates from both actual communication problems associated with older age and negative stereotypes about the competence of older people.

Disadvantages
The disadvantages with elderspeak are the effect it has on older adults and how they are perceived, both by younger adults and by themselves. Older adults often find elderspeak patronizing and disrespectful.  Elderspeak is based on stereotypes because of the way younger adults speak to older adults as if they are less competent, older adults find fewer opportunities to communicate effectively and may experience declines in self-esteem, depression, assumption of dependent behaviour consistent with their stereotypes of elderly individuals. They can even become less interested in social interaction. This cycle of communication is often referred to as the “communication predicament of aging”. Adults receiving elderspeak are often judged by the speaker as being not only less competent, but also as having a worse disposition. The same study showed that when using elderspeak, the speaker was judged as having a worse disposition as well.

Elderspeak can in fact contribute to decreased comprehension, and can increase confusion. Early social scientists first identified elderspeak and estimated that 20% of the communication occurring in nursing homes is actually elderspeak (Caporael, 1981). Caretakers of nursing home residents must be particularly careful when using elderspeak. Although elderspeak has been shown to help older adults with dementia and Alzheimer's in language comprehension, they are not immune to feeling disrespected when it is used. Resisting care is an ongoing problem with dementia patients, as well as violent behaviour, and residents of nursing homes are more likely to resist care when their nurse uses elderspeak. Care givers may assume that the elder prefers the nurturing of elderspeak but older adults think of it as demeaning. Older adults in both institutional settings and those receiving home care services report that as many as 40% of their caregivers use speech they perceive as demeaning, and 75% of the interactions that elderly people have are with the staff of the nursing homes.

Another problem with elderspeak is that licensed practical nurses, registered nurses, and other healthcare team professionals very seldom have training and expertise when it comes to communication with elders, and that elderspeak is often used incorrectly. Shorter sentences appear to have a beneficial effect on older adults’ communication, factors of elderspeak such as slow speech and exaggerated pitch tend to make older persons feel worse about their own competency, as well as the competency of the speaker; However, younger adults continue to use elderspeak with these characteristics. Not only does elderspeak fail to improve communication effectiveness for older adults, the messages inherent in elderspeak may unknowingly reinforce dependency and engender isolation and depression, contributing to the spiral of decline in physical, cognitive, and functional status common for elderly individuals.

Notes

References 
Balsis, S., & Carpenter, B. (2006). Evaluations of elderspeak in a caregiving context. Clinical Gerontologist, 29(1).
Cohen, G., & Faulkner, D. (1986). Does "elder-speak" work? the effect of intonation and stress on comprehension and recall of spoken discourse in old age. Language and Communication, 6, 91-98.
Coupland, N., Coupland, J., Giles, H., & Henwood, K. (1988). Accommodating the elderly: Invoking and extending a theory. Language in Society, 17, 1-44. 
Giles, H., & Ogay, T. (2007). Communication accommodation theory. In B. B. Whaley and W. Samter (Eds.) Explaining communication: Contemporary theories and exemplars, (pp 293–310). 
Herman, R., & Williams, K. (2009). Elderspeak's influence on resistiveness to care: focus on behavioral events. American Journal of Alzheimer's Disease and Other Dementias, 24(5), 417-423.
Kemper, S. (1994). Speech accommodations to older adults. Aging and Cognition, 1, 17-28.
Kemper, S & Aanagnopoulos, C. (1990) Language and Aging. Annual Review of Applied Linguistics, 10: 37-50. 
Kemper, S., Finter-Urczyk, A., Ferrell, P., Harden, T., & Billington, C. (1998). Using Elderspeak with Older Adults. Discourse Processes, 25: 55-73. 
Kemper, S., Ferrell, P., Harden, T., Finter-Urczyk A., & Billington, C. (1998). Use of elderspeak by young and older adults to impaired and unimpaired listeners. Aging, Neuropsychology, and Cognition: A Journal on Normal and Dysfunctional Development, 5, 43-55.
Kemper, S., & Harden, T. (1999). Experimentally disentangling what's beneficial about elderspeak from what's not. Psychology and Aging, 14(4), 656-670.
Kemper, S., Vandeputte, D., Rice, K., Cheung, H., & Gubarchuk, J. (1995). Speech adjustments to aging during a referential communication task. Journal of Language and Social Psychology, 14, 40-59.
Ryan, E. B., Giles, H., Bartolucci, G., & Henwood, K. (1986). Language and  Communication 6:1-24.
Ryan, E. B., Kennaley, D. E., Pratt, M. W. & Shumovich, M. A. (2000). Evaluations by staff, residents and community seniors of patronizing speech in the nursing home: Impact of passive, assertive, or humorous responses. Psychology and Aging, 15, 272-285.
Ryan, E. B., Kwong See, S., Meneer, W. B. & Trovato, D. (1992). Age-based perceptions of language performance among young and older adults. Communication Research, 19, 423-443. 
Small, J.A., Kemper, S., & Lyons, K. (1997). Sentence comprehension in Alzheimer's disease: Effects of grammatical complexity, speech rate, and repetition. Psychology and Aging, 12, 1-11.
William, K., Kemper, S., & Hummert, M. (2004). Journal of Gerontological Nursing. Enhancing Communication with Older Adults: Overcoming Elderspeak., 30(10), 17-25. 
Reynolds, J., (2014). ElderSpeak: A Thesaurus or Compendium of Words Related to Old Age

Ageism
Elderly care
Language varieties and styles